Stiphodon annieae is a freshwater goby only occurring in Halmahera, Indonesia.

Like other Sicydiinae, Stiphodon annieae is found in clear, high gradient streams with rocky bottoms. It lives on the bottom of the river, on top of rocks. It is assumed to be amphidromous.

References

annieae
Taxa named by Philippe Keith
Taxa named by Renny Kurnia Hadiaty
Fish described in 2015